Rademaker is a Dutch occupational surname. It originally meant wheelwright or wainwright. A large number of spelling variations are in use. The most common are (Netherlands and Belgium in 2007 combined):

 Raaijmakers (4086) 
 Raaymakers (301)
 Rademaker (3094)
 Rademakers (2037)
 Raemaekers (939)
 Raeymaekers (2112)
 Raijmakers (1398)
 Ramaekers (3244)
 Ramaker (2122)
 Ramakers (2058)
 Raymakers (504)

Rademaker(s) 
 Abraham Rademaker (1677–1735), Dutch painter and printmaker
 Augusto Rademaker (1905–1985), Brazilian navy admiral and vice-president
 Fons Rademakers (1920–2007), Dutch filmmaker and actor
 Lili Rademakers (born 1930), Dutch film director, wife of Fons
 Richard Rademaker (born 1982), Dutch volleyball player 
 Roland Rademaker (born 1983), Dutch volleyball player (twin brother)
 Sperry Rademaker (1939–2005), American sprint canoer
 Stephen Rademaker (born 1959), American attorney and lobbyist

Raaijmakers/Raaymakers 
 Dick Raaijmakers (1930–2013), Dutch composer, theater producer and theorist
 Ronald Raaymakers (born 1990), New Zealand rugby player

Raemaekers 
 Hector Raemaekers (1883–1963), Belgian footballer
 Louis Raemaekers (1869–1956), Dutch painter and cartoonist

Raeymaeckers 
 Jürgen Raeymaeckers (born 1985), Belgian footballer

Raijmakers/Raymaker(s) 
Herman C. Raymaker (1893–1944), American film director and actor
Piet Raijmakers (born 1956), Dutch equestrian

Ramackers 
 Josée Vigneron-Ramackers (1914–2002), Belgian music educator, conductor and composer

Ramaekers 
 Serge Ramaekers (born 1966), Belgian DJ

See also
Rademacher
Radermacher

References

Dutch-language surnames